refers to the type of coffeehouses that featured the customers' joining in singing songs together, which was very popular in Japan in ca. 1955–1975. 

Utagoe coffeehouses were usually associated with the leftist movement at that time, called the Utagoe movement, supported by the labor unions, backed up by the socialist and communist parties.  The songs that were sung, therefore, were mostly anti-establishment, anti-war songs that included many of Russian, Eastern European and Chinese origins.

Most of the utagoe coffeehouses went out of business in ca. 1995–2005, giving way to the karaoke houses that became a big business during the 1980s, but two or three utagoe coffeehouses still exist in Tokyo, such as Tomoshibi.

See also
 Coffeehouses
 Karaoke
 Utagoe Movement

References

External links
 Utagoe Cafes in Tokyo

Types of coffeehouses and cafés
Singing